Steffen Rüdiger Seibert (born 7 June 1960 in Munich) is a German journalist who served as head of the German Federal Government's Press and Information Office and as the German government's spokesperson from 2010 to 2021. During his tenure, Seibert was officially ranked as a Secretary of State.

From late 2016 Seibert was a member of the German government's cabinet committee on Brexit at which ministers discuss organizational and structural issues related to the United Kingdom's departure from the European Union.

Previously Seibert worked for the German television station ZDF as a journalist and presenter of the popular heute-journal (until 2010).

Biography 
Seibert was born in Munich in 1960, and went to school at the Tellkampfschule in Hanover. He then studied history in Hamburg and at the London School of Economics.

Seibert is married (his wife is an artist), and has a daughter and two sons. They lived in Wiesbaden before moving to Berlin's Dahlem district in 2011.

Television journalist at ZDF 
Seibert worked for ZDF from 1989 to 2010. In addition to his roles at ZDF, he co-hosted the Bavarian TV Awards in 2005 (alongside Nina Ruge) and in 2009 (alongside Markus Kavka). He also moderated the event series Nobelpreisträger in Mönchengladbach with guests F. W. de Klerk (2004), Mikhail Gorbachev (2007) and the 14th Dalai Lama (2008).

Recognition 
 2001 – Goldene Kamera (for Special Show 9/11)
 2005 – Bambi (shared with Johannes B. Kerner for a show for the disaster victims of the tsunami in the 2004 Indian Ocean earthquake)
 2013 – Order of the Star of Italy

Other activities 
 UNICEF National Committee of Germany, Member
 "Club for early born babies" (Bundesverband "Das frühgeborene Kind"), Chairman (until 2008)
 International Journalists' Programmes, Arthur F. Burns Fellowship Program, Member of the Board of Trustees
 Städel Museum, Member of the Board of Trustees
 Kinderhospiz Bethel, Official Partner

Before taking on his current position, Seibert was an ambassador of UNICEF in Germany. In this capacity, he visited some of the organization's projects in Angola in 2003.

References

External links

German male journalists
German television journalists
German broadcast news analysts
1960 births
Living people
Spokespersons
ZDF people